The Dreamer is the twenty-ninth and final studio album recorded by American R&B singer Etta James. It was released on November 8, 2011 as her final album because of her battle with leukaemia at the time and released more than two months before her death. The album received mostly positive reviews from critics.

Track listing

References

Etta James albums
2011 albums